Oh, Charlie is My Darling is a song by Irving Bibo from 1927 and was published by Bibo, Boedon & Lang.

References 

Bibliography
Crew, Danny O. “Presidential Sheet Music: An Illustrated Catalogue of Published Music Associated with the American Presidency and Those Who Sought the Office”. Jefferson, North Carolina: McFarland, 2001.  
Jasen, David A. Tin Pan Alley: The Composers, the Songs, the Performers, and Their Times : the Golden Age of American Popular Music from 1886 to 1956. New York: D.I. Fine, 1988. . 
Parker, Bernard S. “World War I Sheet Music: 9,670 Patriotic Songs Published in the United States, 1914-1920, with More Than 600 Covers Illustrated. Jefferson, N.C.: McFarland, 2007.  

1927 songs